111 East Maple Street is a historic house located at the address of the same name in Maquoketa, Iowa.

Description and history 
This is one of five Greek Revival houses in Maquoketa that represent its earliest extant houses built during its early growth period. Built in about 1855, it features a gable end facade, cornice returns, and slightly pedimented framing on the door and window openings. Most of these features have been subsequently covered by siding. This property was bought by Jonas Clark from John and Eliza Goodenow in 1850. Three years later they ran against each other for mayor with Goodenow winning 32–17. Clark, who was one of the first settlers here, worked as a shop keeper and a stable keeper and would go on to represent Ward 4 as an alderman.

The house was listed on the National Register of Historic Places on August 9, 1991.

References

Houses completed in 1855
Greek Revival houses in Iowa
Houses in Maquoketa, Iowa
National Register of Historic Places in Jackson County, Iowa
Houses on the National Register of Historic Places in Iowa